Chamaepsichia rubrochroa is a species of moth of the family Tortricidae. It is found in Bolivia.

The wingspan is about 19 mm. The forewings are similar to Chamaepsichia durranti, but the markings (including the blotch at the mid-costa) are atrophying. The hindwings are also similar, but the subapical line is longer.

Etymology
The name refers to the colouration of the species and is derived from Latin ruber (meaning red) and Greek chroa or chroos (meaning skin of the body).

References

Moths described in 2009
Chamaepsichia
Moths of South America
Taxa named by Józef Razowski